Bhubaneswar Kalita (born 1 April 1951) is an Indian social worker, politician and a member of Bharatiya Janata Party serving as the  Member of Rajya Sabha from Assam since 2020,from 2014 to 2019,2008 to 2014,1990 to 1996 and 1984 to 1990.He was member of Lok Sabha From 1998 to 1999. Earlier, he was member of Indian National Congress.He was also MLA of Assam from Rangiya from 2001 to 2006 and a minister in the Government of Assam from 2002 to 2004 and president of Assam Pradesh Congress Commitee from 2004 to 2006. 

He has completed Masters in Arts  in 1974 and L.L.B. in 1978 from Gauhati University. Earlier he had studied B.A. from Cotton College, Guwahati in 1971 and had done Matriculation from Rangia High School at Rangia in 1967.

References

Living people
Rajya Sabha members from Assam
1951 births
People from Kamrup district
India MPs 1998–1999
Bharatiya Janata Party politicians from Assam
Indian National Congress politicians from Assam
Lok Sabha members from Assam
Assam MLAs 2001–2006